The Martinican Democratic Rally (RDM) is a Martinican political party founded on March 26, 2006 by  Claude Lise, Senator and President of the General Council. Lise was a member of the Martinican Progressive Party. The party favors the autonomy of Martinique within France, unlike the nationalist MIM. The party has one seat in the European Parliament, Madeleine de Grandmaison. It also has 9 seats in the general council and 3 in the regional council.

References

External links
 RDM official site

Political parties in Martinique
Left-wing nationalist parties
Socialist parties in France